Charles Jon Brainerd (born 1944) is an American psychologist and professor in the College of Human Ecology at Cornell University. He is known for developing fuzzy-trace theory with his wife and colleague, Valerie F. Reyna. He serves as editor-in-chief of the peer-reviewed scientific journal Developmental Review.

Education and career
Brainerd was educated at Michigan State University. His first academic appointment was as an assistant professor at the University of Windsor from 1970 to 1971. He served on the faculty of the University of Alberta from 1971, initially as an assistant professor, before being promoted to associate professor there in 1973.  1976 to 1983, he was a professor at the University of Western Ontario. In 1983, he returned to the University of Alberta to become the Henry Marshall Tory Professor and Director Center for Research in Child Development there. He was a professor of educational psychology at the University of Arizona from 1987 to 1997, and taught Special Education, Rehabilitation, and School Psychology there from 1997 to 2004. After a one-year stint teaching psychology at the University of Texas, he joined the human development faculty of Cornell in 2005.

Honors and awards
Brainerd is a member of the National Academy of Education, as well as a Fellow of the American Psychological Association's Division of General Psychology, Division of Experimental Psychology, Division of Developmental Psychology, and Division of Educational Psychology. He is also a Fellow of the American Psychological Society and the Psychonomic Society. He has received the Spirit of Excellence Award from the Governor of Arizona.

References

External links

Faculty page

1944 births
Living people
Academic journal editors
Cornell University faculty
Michigan State University alumni
Academic staff of University of Windsor
Academic staff of the University of Alberta
Academic staff of the University of Western Ontario
University of Arizona faculty
University of Texas faculty
Fellows of the Association for Psychological Science
American psychologists